Following the 2017 election, John Schmidt Andersen from Venstre had won a second term as mayor of Frederikssund Municipality

In this election, Venstre would end up winning 7 seats, 2 less than in 2017. Local party Fjordlandslisten would also win a seat, and could possibly become the deciding mandate, as both the traditional blocs had won 11 seats. In the end they opted for supporting Tina Tving Stauning from the Social Democrats to take over the mayor's position. With the Danish Social Liberal Party, the Green Left and the Red–Green Alliance also supporting her, she would become the new mayor.

Electoral system
For elections to Danish municipalities, a number varying from 9 to 31 are chosen to be elected to the municipal council. The seats are then allocated using the D'Hondt method and a closed list proportional representation.
Frederikssund Municipality had 23 seats in 2021

Unlike in Danish General Elections, in elections to municipal councils, electoral alliances are allowed.

Electoral alliances  

Electoral Alliance 1

Electoral Alliance 2

Electoral Alliance 3

Electoral Alliance 4

Results

Notes

References 

Frederikssund
Politics of Denmark